Pizzo Badile Camuno is a mountain of Lombardy, Italy.

Mountains of Lombardy
Mountains of the Alps